Dismember or dismemberment refers to the act of removing the limbs of a living thing.

Dismember or Dismemberment may also refer to:

Dismember (band), a Swedish death metal band formed in Stockholm in 1988
Dismember (album), 2008
"Dismember", a song by Spoon from their 1996 album Telephono 
"Dismembered", a song by KUKL from their 1984 album The Eye
Dismemberment (illusion), stage illusion
Dismembered, a 2003 film starring Dennis Haskins
"Dismembered", a song by Jerry Cantrell from his 2021 album Brighten